The 1948 Rhode Island gubernatorial election was held on November 2, 1948. Incumbent Democrat John Pastore defeated Republican nominee Albert P. Ruerat with 61.15% of the vote.

General election

Candidates
Major party candidates
John Pastore, Democratic 
Albert P. Ruerat, Republican

Other candidates
Clemens J. France, Progressive

Results

References

1948
Rhode Island
Gubernatorial